Servia–Velventos (Sérvia-Velventós) is a former municipality in the Kozani regional unit, Greece, that existed between 2011 and 2019. The seat of the municipality was the town Servia. The municipality has an area of 728.166 km2.

Municipality
The municipality Servia–Velventos was formed at the 2011 local government reform by the merger of the following 4 former municipalities, that became municipal units:
Kamvounia
Livadero
Servia
Velventos

At the 2019 local government reform, the municipality was split into two municipalities: Servia (containing the municipal units Servia, Kamvounia and Livadero) and Velventos.

References

Former municipalities in Western Macedonia
Populated places in Kozani (regional unit)